Mark Collie is the third studio album by the American country music artist of the same name. It was released in 1993 by MCA Records. It featured the singles "Even the Man in the Moon Is Cryin'", "Shame Shame Shame Shame", "Born to Love You" and "Something's Gonna Change Her Mind". It peaked at number 38 on the Top Country Albums chart.

Critical reception

Brian Mansfield of AllMusic gave the record 4.5 out of 5 stars, writing that: "At once a move to the mainstream and a return to Collie's West Tennessee rockabilly roots, the album worked fairly well."

Track listing

Personnel
Mark Collie, Mark Casstevens: acoustic guitar
Brent Mason, Brian Franklin: electric guitar
Bruce Bouton: Steel Guitar, slide guitar
John Barlow Jarvis: keyboards
Glenn Worf: bass guitar, upright bass
Lonnie Wilson: drums, percussion
Mark Collie: vocals
Deborah Allen, John Wesley Ryles, Harry Stinson, Dennis Wilson: backing vocals

Production
Produced by Don Cook
Recorded and mixed by Mike Bradley
Assistant engineer: Mark Capps
Mastered by Hank Williams

Chart performance

References

Liner Notes: "Mark Collie" CD.  MCA Records, 1993

1993 albums
Mark Collie albums
MCA Records albums
Albums produced by Don Cook